Drive, formerly known as Radio 2 Drive, is the afternoon program on the CBC Music radio network in Canada, launched September 2, 2008.

On air from 3:30 to 7:00 pm, it is hosted by Rich Terfry, also known as Buck 65. The program airs a "mix of current singer-songwriters, roots and urban music". It was a major change for Radio 2, which had previously focused on classical music and jazz.

References

CBC Music programs
Canadian music radio programs
2008 establishments in Canada
2008 radio programme debuts